The American College of Clinical Pharmacy (ACCP) is a pharmacy professional association representing the interests of clinical pharmacists.  ACCP is the publisher of Pharmacotherapy.

According to the ACCP, its purpose is to advance human health by extending the frontiers of clinical pharmacy. It has more than 15,000 members.

References

Pharmacy organizations in the United States
Pharmacy-related professional associations
Organizations established in 1942
1942 establishments in the United States